The 1916 Florida gubernatorial election was held on November 7, 1916 to determine the Governor for the State of Florida. Democratic incumbent Governor Park Trammell was term-limited and could not run for re-election.

Sidney J. Catts, a pastor turned insurance salesman, originally entered the Democratic primary as a candidate for Governor. The state Democratic organization was not at all pleased with this challenge from a novice and 'outsider' and the primary campaign was hotly contested. Catts was initially declared the winner of the party's nomination, but the party leadership got the State Supreme Court to authorize a recount—and Catts was 'counted out.' Catts became the first, and so far only, man ever elected to a statewide office as a Prohibitionist. The official Democratic nominee was William V. Knott, the former and future Florida State Treasurer.

The 1916 election had a much higher turnout, 82,885 votes compared to 48,465 votes in 1912, due to the chasm in the Democratic Party. This means that even though Trammell and Catts both won nearly similar vote tallies, 569 votes separating the 1912 and 1916 winners, Trammell won by over 80% of the vote in 1912, while Catts got slightly under 48% of the vote. This was the only time a non-Democrat was elected Governor in Florida for the 90 years between the end of Reconstruction in 1877 and the rise of a competitive two party system in the 1960s.

Catts proved to be much more of a colorful personality and a better campaigner then both of his major opponents, his hostile attacks on Roman Catholicism and German-Americans winning the support of the state's conservative voters. Catts himself quickly returned to the Democratic Party and failed thrice to win a party primary (Senate in 1920, Governor in 1924 and 1928), while Knott would serve another decade and a half in his office of State Treasurer.

Results

See also

 Democratic Party
 Republican Party
 Prohibition Party

References

External links
US Elections Atlas page on the 1916 election
Our Campaigns page on Sidney Catts
Our Campaigns page on the 1916 election
Our Campaigns page on the 1912 election

1916
Gubernatorial
Florida
November 1916 events